The Latin Rite Catholic Diocese of Palmerston North is  a suffragan Diocese of the Roman Catholic Archdiocese of Wellington. It was formed on 6 March 1980 when the Archdiocese was divided. The Diocese has an area of area 36,200 km² and had, in 2011, 59,099 Catholics, 58 Priests, 141 Religious and a total population of 470,000 people. The Cathedral of Palmerston North is the Cathedral of the Holy Spirit.

Ordinaries of Palmerston North
{| class="wikitable"
! width="25%"|Tenure
! width="40%"|Incumbent
! width="20%"|Life
|- valign=top bgcolor="#ffffec"
|1980 to 2012||Peter James Cullinane||1936 to present 
|- valign=top bgcolor="#ffffec"
|2012 to 2019||Charles Edward Drennan||1960 to present 
|- valign=top bgcolor="#ffffec"
|2019 to present||Vacant||

Present Bishops
 John Cardinal Dew, Apostolic Administrator (2019-present)
 Peter James Cullinane (born 1936), Bishop Emeritus of Palmerston North (2012–present); Bishop of Palmerston North (1980-2012).
 Owen John Dolan (born 1928) Coadjutor Bishop Emeritus of Palmerston North (2004–present); Coadjutor Bishop of Palmerston North (1995-2004).
 Charles Edward Drennan (born 1960), Bishop of Palmerston North (2012-2019); Coadjutor Bishop of Palmerston North (2011-2012).

See also
 Cathedral of the Holy Spirit, Palmerston North
 Francis Douglas (priest)
 Holy Name Seminary
 Holy Cross College (New Zealand)
 Roman Catholicism in New Zealand
 List of New Zealand Catholic bishops
 Southern Star Abbey
 Palmerston North
 New Plymouth
 Napier
 Hastings
 Whanganui

Secondary schools

 Cullinane College, Whanganui
 Francis Douglas Memorial College, New Plymouth
 Hato Paora College, Feilding
 Sacred Heart College, Napier
 Sacred Heart Girls' College, New Plymouth
 St John's College, Hastings
 St Joseph's Māori Girls' College, Taradale, Napier
 St Peter's College, Palmerston North

Notes

External links and references

Catholic Diocese of Palmerston North

Palmerston North